Echinopsis aurea,  is a species of Echinopsis found in Argentina.

References

External links
 
 

aurea